The Indori river (Hindi: इन्दोरी नदी), is a rain-fed river originates from Aravalli Range from Sikar district and flows through Alwar district of Rajasthan to Rewari district of Haryana and it is the longest tributary of Sahibi River which stretches to 50 km. In Delhi, it is called the Najafgarh drain or Najafgarh Nallah.

Archaeological findings

Archaeological findings on the Sahibi River have confirmed habitations on its banks before the Harappan and pre-Mahabharata periods. Both handmade and wheel-made earthenware dated from 3309–2709 BCE and 2879–2384 BCE has been found on the banks of the Sahibi River at Jodhpura. INTACH-Rewari found pottery on the Sahibi riverbed at Hansaka in the Rewari district. A red stone statue of Vamana Dev was found in the Sahibi riverbed near Bawal in 2002; the statue is now displayed at the Shri Krishna Museum, Kurukshetra. Other artifacts discovered in the Sahibi River include arrowheads, fishhooks, appearheads, awls, and chisels.

Identification with Vedic rivers 
 
Several modern scholars identify the old Ghaggar-Hakra River (of which Tangri river is a tributary) as the Sarasvati river and the Sahibi River with the Drishadvati river of Vedic period, on the banks of which Indus–Sarasvati civilisation developed. such scholars include Bhargava The Drishadwati River formed one border of the Vedic state of Brahmavarta and was mentioned in the Rigveda, the Manusmriti, and the Brahmin Granths texts.

Gallery

See also 

 Krishnavati river
 Dangri, a tributary of Sarsuti 
 Tangri river, a tributary of Sarsuti, merge if Dangri and Tangri are same 
 Sarsuti, a tributary of Ghaggar-Hakra River 
 Kaushalya river, a tributary of Ghaggar-Hakra River
 Chautang, a tributary of Ghaggar-Hakra River
 Sutlej, a tributary of Indus
 Ganges
 Indus
 Western Yamuna Canal, branches off Yamuna
 List of rivers of Rajasthan
 List of rivers of India
 List of dams and reservoirs in India

External links 

Sarasvati-Sindhu civilization and Sarasvati River
The Saraswati: Where lies the mystery by Saswati Paik

References

Rivers of Haryana
Rivers of Rajasthan
Tributaries of the Yamuna River
Yamuna River
Drainage canals
Canals in India
Archaeological sites in Haryana
Archaeological sites in Rajasthan
Indus basin
Indus Valley civilisation sites
Rigvedic rivers
Rivers of India